Acronicta exilis, the exiled dagger moth, is a moth of the family Noctuidae. The species is found in North America, including Iowa, New York, Maryland Arkansas and Delaware.

The larvae feed on Quercus species.

External links
Images
Moths of Maryland

Acronicta
Moths of North America
Moths described in 1874